Marcelo Romo (23 April 1941 – 23 January 2018) was a Chilean actor. He appeared in more than thirty films since 1969.

Selected filmography

References

External links 

1941 births
2018 deaths
Chilean male film actors
Chilean actor-politicians
Male actors from Santiago